Kamineni Srinivas is a member of the Bharatiya Janata Party from Andhra Pradesh. He has won the 2014 Andhra Pradesh Legislative Assembly election from Kaikalur.

He won with 88,092 votes in Assembly Election in Krishna district by a margin of 21,571 compared to his political rival Ram Prasad Uppala of YSR Congress Party. He was the Health minister of Andhra Pradesh from 2014 - March 2018. In his tenure he carried out many reforms in Health Ministry.

References

Living people
Politicians from Rajahmundry
Bharatiya Janata Party politicians from Andhra Pradesh
Telugu politicians
Andhra Pradesh MLAs 2014–2019
Praja Rajyam Party politicians
Year of birth missing (living people)